Arima is a parliamentary electoral district in Trinidad and Tobago in the north of Trinidad, including part of the borough of Arima. It is currently represented by Pennelope Beckles.

This constituency was created by the Boundaries Commission prior to the 1961 Trinidad and Tobago general election. In 2004, five polling divisions were removed from the district to create the constituency of D'Abadie/O'Meara and one polling division was removed to create La Horquetta/Talparo for the 2007 Trinidad and Tobago general election. It was previously considered to be a safe PNM seat, but was won by the COP in the 2010 general election.

Members of Parliament 
This constituency has elected the following members of the House of Representatives of Trinidad and Tobago:

Election results

Elections in the 2020s

Elections in the 2010s

References 

Constituencies of the Parliament of Trinidad and Tobago
Arima